The 2020 America's Cup World Series was held between 17 and 20 December 2020 in the lead up to the 2021 America's Cup.

Teams
Four teams have entered the regatta

Standings

Cancelled schedules
World Series races in Sardinia and Portsmouth were cancelled due to the impact of the COVID-19 pandemic on sports.

Auckland schedule
A total of 12 races were contested during the double round-robin seeding round. All races were 6 legs (3 upwind and 3 downwind), except for Race 7 which was 8 legs (Excess wind), Race 9 which was 4 legs (Course Shorten mid race), Race 10 which was 5 legs (Light winds) and Race 12 which was 4 legs (Light winds).

Christmas Race
After seeded based on record, followed by a single-elimination knockout round All races were to be run on Course A, but races were abandoned due to light winds, with no winner declared. The race between Emirates Team New Zealand and Ineos Team UK started, and the course was shortened to four legs midway through the race. New Zealand held a commanding lead, expecting to finish before the UK had even completed their first lap but, as NZ did not reach the finish line within the 45-minute time limit, the race was declared over with no winner. Winds did not increase during the day, and so the second semi-final and finals races were abandoned with backup day having been scheduled.

See also
2021 America's Cup
2021 Prada Cup
2015–16 America's Cup World Series

References

External links

World Series
America's Cup
America's Cup
America's Cup
Americas Cup World Series